Turner Gallery may refer to:

 The Clore Gallery at the Tate Britain, London, England, housing work by J. M. W. Turner
 Turner Contemporary, a contemporary art gallery in Margate, Kent, England
 Turner House Gallery, a gallery in Penarth, Wales, originally built to house a collection of Turner paintings

See also
 Turner Museum (disambiguation)
 Turner House (disambiguation)